Empresas Públicas de Medellín (EPM) was established on 18 November 1955 as a residential public utilities company which, initially, only served the inhabitants of Medellin, Colombia its hometown.

EPM is the head of a group that consists of twelve companies and has equity participation in eight others in the electricity and water sectors.  Its affiliate EPM Telecomunicaciones, which operates under the name UNE, controls seven other companies in various cities around the country.

Organized as a state-owned, industrial and commercial enterprise, owned by the municipality of Medellin, EPM provides electricity, gas, water, sanitation, and telecommunications.

EPM is present in following areas in Colombia: Antioquia, Bogotá, Manizales, Armenia, Pereira, Bucaramanga, Cúcuta, Barranquilla, Cartagena, Cali, and Quibdó.

EPM international: in Panama, the company is implementing the Bonyic hydroelectric project through its affiliate Hidroecológica del Teribe.  In Guadalajara, Mexico, it is providing advice and technical assistance for the implementation of potable water, sanitary sewers, and wastewater treatment projects; and it is providing telecommunications services in the United States and Spain under the brand UNE.

Strategic business units
Electricity, gas over a pipeline, waters and telecommunications:  EPM has been active in these four areas of public utilities and is currently implementing a number of projects to consolidate its leadership.

Energy
Research and use of different energy sources, the development of a complete distribution system that reaches every municipality of Antioquia, and the provision of gas over a network are aspects of a company that holds an outstanding place in the Colombian electrical sector, supplying 23.9% share of the demand in the country.

EPM has built the backbone of the hydroelectric system in Colombia.  After many years of experience developing hydroelectric projects, EPM has been advancing for more than a decade with research on the use of other energy sources as a way to contribute to the planet's environmental sustainability and to open new areas for its national and international growth.

 Net effective capacity of EPM's generation system: 2597.6 MW, equivalent to 19.34% of the nation's installed generation capacity.
 Distribution system: 22% of the national total.
 Gas over a pipeline: 9% share in the Colombian market.

Energy generation
 Hydroelectric power stations: 24
 Thermoelectric power stations: 1 (La Sierra thermoelectric power station, municipality of Puerto Nare, Antioquia)
 Wind Farms: 1 (Jepirachi, in the upper Colombian region Guajira)

Porce III and Porce IV, with a capacity of 660 MW and 400 MW respectively, are two of the hydroelectric generation projects currently under construction.

The first generation unit in Porce III will start producing electrical energy at the end of 2010, and around the same time construction of the first civil works for Porce IV will begin. Operations will start in 2015.

In Panama, through its affiliate Hidrológica del Teribe (HET), the Bonyic hydroelectric power station is being built. This power station will be able to generate up to 31.3 MW and will contribute to decrease that country's dependence on imported oil and other fossil fuels that are highly contaminating of the environment.

In Colombia, EPM is also part of the corporation that is working to develop the Hidroituango project, which will have the largest capacity in the country with a total of 2400 MW.

All these projects that consolidate EPM's important role in the Colombian electrical landscape also indicate the path taken in their research on alternative energy sources. For example, the pioneering experience of Jepirachi which uses wind energy, and La Vuelta and La Herradura micro power stations which meet the conditions established by the Kyoto Protocol as a mechanism for clean development.

Energy transmission and distribution
 Networks: 60,255 km
 Transformers: 90,000
 Substations: 133

EPM brings the magic of light to thousands of people in Antioquia.  Its energy transmission and distribution strategic business unit (SBU) transports and sells energy, reaching 1,720,000 homes in 123 municipalities around Antioquia, and in one municipality of Chocó, covering an area of approximately 64,000 km2.

In the rest of Colombia, it provides this utility to 340 municipalities through its affiliates CHEC and EDEQ in the Colombian coffee growing axis, and in the east of the country through two other companies in its portfolio: ESSA and CENS in the Santander Department and Norte de Santander Department, respectively.  The company is currently serving 12,000,000 Colombians.

Natural Gas
 Steel pipelines: 82.9 km
 Polyethylene pipelines: 3811 km
 Regulation stations: 16
 Ringed customers: 798,891
 Connected customers: 474,516

Since 1996, when the pilot stage was implemented, EPM has been providing natural gas service over a pipeline, a safe, economical and environmentally friendly energy alternative which is currently being expanded to the ten municipalities that make up the Aburrá Valley, including Medellin, and other locations around Antioquia.

The service has been diversified to meet the needs of industries, SME's, retailers and transportation providers, in addition to household subscribers. For large industrial companies, EPM expanded its natural gas coverage to the municipalities of Guarne and Rionegro, in the East of Antioquia.

Residential natural gas
 Households served: 448,286
 SME's and retailers: 6,572

The expansion into other municipalities in Antioquia started in 2009 using the Compressed Natural Gas system: La Ceja, La Unión, and El Retiro.

Natural gas for vehicles (VNG)
A service that is reflected in an improved quality of air for the Metropolitan area of Medellin.

 Vehicles converted to use natural gas in the Aburrá Valley: 30,865
 Service stations: 51

Water
 Potabilization plants: 10
 Waterworks: 3,580 km
 Waste water collection and transportation networks: 4,315 km
 Coverage: 100% in the urban areas of the Aburrá Valley

Potable water, and waste water collection, transportation, and treatment are the services provided by EPM, throughout the ten municipalities of the Aburrá Valley: Medellin, Bello, Envigado, Itagüí, La Estrella, Sabaneta, Copacabana, Girardota, Caldas and Barbosa, with a total of 919,691 subscribers.

Regional companies
In addition, in various parts of Antioquia and the country EPM continues to implement the model of regional water systems, with the regional companies for Urabá, the West, Quibdó, and the East of Antioquia.

In an alliance with several institutions in Antioquia, Empresas Públicas de Oriente was recently created to provide waterworks, sewer and sanitation services in several rural and suburban areas in the municipalities of Envigado, Rionegro, and El Retiro.

Cleanup of the Medellin River

In order to continue cleaning up the Medellin River, which is the city's most important water body, EPM will start construction of the second waste water treatment plant in the Aburrá Valley.

After ten years of operation, the San Fernando treatment plant, with the capacity to treat 1.8 m/s, the Bello plant will be built in the North, with the capacity to treat 5.0 m/s beginning in 2012.

Also, to transport the waste waters to the new plant, the 8 km long 'North Interceptor' will be built, conceived as an unprecedented engineering work in Antioquia.

Telecommunications
This is UNE, an EPM Group company.

Including all its affiliates, the company serves close to 70% of the urban population in Colombia.

 Fixed telephony: 2.096,000 lines
 Internet: 563,846 users
 Television: 755,000 users

EPM Group

EPM's investment portfolio consists of seven energy companies, one of them headquartered in Panama, and the promotion of regional waterworks and basic sanitation entities. Its affiliate EPM Telecomunicaciones, heads seven companies in this sector, with operations in Colombia, the United States and Spain.

Social and Education Investments

Empresas Publicas de Medellin leads the Fondo EPM para la Educacion Superior (EPM's University Education Fund) which benefits more than 3000 students from Medellin and Antioquia. EPM also holds a public library containing a variate collection of engineering books.

References

External links 

 Official website of Empresas Públicas de Medellín

Public utilities established in 1955
Government-owned companies of Colombia
1955 establishments in Colombia